The Alley Cats are a Los Angeles, California-based punk rock trio formed in 1977. The original line-up, featuring Randy Stodola (guitar and vocals), Dianne Chai (bass and vocals) and John McCarthy (drums), was a fixture of the early L.A. punk rock scene. Signed to Dangerhouse Records alongside other seminal California-based punk bands including the Bags, Black Randy and the Metro Squad, and X, they released their first single "Nothing Means Nothing Anymore" backed with "Give Me a Little Pain" on March 30, 1978. They are among the six bands featured on the 1979 compilation album Yes L.A. and appear in the 1982 film Urgh! A Music War.

The Alley Cats were regular performers at such Los Angeles venues as Club 88, Hong Kong Café, The Masque, and the Whisky a Go Go.

Reformed as "The Zarkons", they released two albums, Riders In The Long Black Parade (1985) and Between the Idea & the Reality…Falls the Shadow (1988), before disbanding in 1988.

After a 20-year hiatus, Stodola reformed the trio and currently performs as The Alley Cats along with Apryl Cady (bass and vocals) and Matt Laskey (drums).

Discography

Albums
1981 - Nightmare City
1982 - Escape From The Planet Earth
1985 - Riders In The Long Black Parade (as The Zarkons)
1988 - Between the Idea & the Reality…Falls the Shadow (as The Zarkons)
2007 - 1979-1982 (Anthology)

Singles and EPs
1978 - Nothing Means Nothing Anymore
1980 - Too Much Junk

Soundtracks and compilations
1979 - Yes L.A. (compilation)
1981 - Urgh! A Music War (soundtrack)
1991 - Dangerhouse, Vol. 1 (compilation)
1993 - Dangerhouse, Vol. 2: Give Me A Little Pain! (compilation)
1993 - We're Desperate: The L.A. Scene 1976-79 (compilation) - "Nothing Means Nothing Anymore"
1996 - Live From the Masque, Vol. 2: We We Can Can Do Do What What (compilation) 
2020 - SPIKE: A San Pedro Compilation (compilation)

Filmography
1981 - Urgh! A Music War
2011 - The Alley Cats Live at the Whiskey A Go Go

References

External links
 The Alley Cats
 Time Coast Music
 2018 Interview with Randy Stodola

Punk rock groups from California
Musical groups from Los Angeles
Musical groups established in 1978
Musical groups disestablished in 1988
American musical trios
Dangerhouse Records artists
1978 establishments in California